Sagua la Chica River is a river of northern Cuba, that flows through Villa Clara Province. Arising in the hills of Placetas, it flows north for 45 miles and empties into the Bay of Buena Vista.

Villages
Towns and villages near the Sauga la Chica include:
 Falcón
 El Berro
 Crucero Carmita
 Luis Arcos Bergnes (or Carmita)
 Vega Alta
 Canoa (or La Canoa)
 Rincón (or El Rincón)
 El Perico (or Perico)
 Pavón
 Las Bocas
 Vega Redonda
 Arroyo Naranjo 
 Sagua la Chica (town)
 El Santo

See also
Sagua la Grande River
List of rivers of Cuba

References

The Columbia Gazetteer of North America. 2000.

Rivers of Cuba
Geography of Villa Clara Province